Louis Jules Henri du Le Vaillant du Douet de Graville (27 February 1831 – 12 October 1912) was a French equestrian. He competed in the equestrian mail coach event at the 1900 Summer Olympics.

References

External links

1831 births
1912 deaths
French male equestrians
Olympic equestrians of France
Equestrians at the 1900 Summer Olympics
Sportspeople from Seine-Maritime